Alcampo is the name of the 2nd biggest hypermarket chain in Spain. The company started its activity in 1981, with the first hypermarket built in Utebo, Zaragoza. It is part of Groupe Auchan SA.

Location of Alcampo hypermarkets in Spain 
(* The hypermarkets with Alcampo gas stations are marked with italics)

Galicia 
 A Coruña
 Ferrol
 Santiago de Compostela
 Vigo (Avd. Madrid)
 Vigo (Coia)
 Vilagarcía de Arousa

Asturias 
 Gijón
 Valle del Nalón

País Vasco 
 Irun
 Oiartzun

La Rioja 
 Logroño

Castilla y León 
 Burgos
 Aranda de Duero

Castilla-La Mancha 
 Albacete
 Cuenca
 Toledo

Madrid 
 Alcalá de Henares
 Alcobendas
 Alcorcón (C.C. Parque Oeste)
 Colmenar Viejo
 Fuenlabrada
 Getafe
 Leganés (C.C. Parquesur)
 Madrid (Avenida Pío XII)
 Madrid (C.C. La Vaguada)
 Madrid (Vallecas)
 Majadahonda (C.C. Gran Plaza 2)
 Moratalaz
 Torrejón de Ardoz
 Torrelodones
 Villanueva de la Cañada

Aragón 
 Utebo
 Zaragoza (Los Enlaces)
 Zaragoza (Plaza Utrillas)

Cataluña 
 Barcelona
 Sant Adrià de Besòs
 Sant Quirze del Vallès
 Mataró
 Sant Boi de Llobregat

Comunidad Valenciana 
 Castellón
 Alboraya
 Aldaia
 Alicante
 Orihuela

Murcia 
 Murcia

Baleares 
 Marratxí

Andalucía 
 Granada
 Motril
 Linares
 Sevilla (Ronda del tamarguillo)
 Sevilla (Sevilla Este)
 Marbella
 Almería
 Sanlúcar de Barrameda
 Jerez de la Frontera

Canarias 
 La Laguna
 Telde
 La Orotava

References

Hypermarkets
Retail companies of Spain